Ed Watson may refer to:
Edgar Watson (1855–1910), American outlaw
Edwin Moss Watson (1867–1937), American newspaper editor
Edwin "Pa" Watson (1883–1945), top aide to U.S. President Franklin D. Roosevelt

See also
Edward Watson (disambiguation)